Diner lingo is a kind of American verbal slang used by cooks and chefs in diners and diner-style restaurants, and by the wait staff to communicate their orders to the cooks. Usage of terms with similar meaning, propagated by oral culture within each establishment, may vary by region or even among restaurants in the same locale.

History
The origin of the lingo is unknown, but there is evidence suggesting it may have been used by waiters as early as the 1870s and 1880s. Many of the terms used are lighthearted and tongue-in-cheek and some are a bit racy or ribald, but are helpful mnemonic devices for short-order cooks and staff. Diner lingo was most popular in diners and luncheonettes from the 1920s to the 1970s.

List of terms

 86 – omit from an order; "hold"
 Adam and Eve on a raft – two poached eggs atop toast
 Adam's ale – water
 Angels on horseback – oysters wrapped in bacon
 Axle grease – butter or margarine
 B&B – bread and butter
 Baled hay – shredded wheat
 Bad breath – onions
 Bark – frankfurter
 Battle Creek in a bowl – bowl of corn flakes cereal
 Belly warmer – coffee
 BLT – bacon/lettuce/tomato sandwich
 Biddy board – French toast
 Blue plate special
 Blowout patches – pancakes
 Board – slice of toast
 Boiled leaves – hot tea
 Bowl of red – chili con carne
 Bow wow – hot dog
 Brick – biscuit
 Bridge/Bridge party – four of anything
 Bronx vanilla – garlic; originated in the 1920s.
 Bullets – beans
 Burn it – well done
 Burn the British – toasted English muffin
 Cackleberries – eggs
 Cats' eyes – tapioca pudding
 Checkerboard – waffle
 City juice – water
 coffee high and dry - black coffee (no cream or sugar)
 Cowboy with spurs – western omelette with fries
 Cow paste – butter
 Dead eye – poached egg
 Deluxe – varies from restaurant to restaurant, generally refers to "all the toppings"
 Dogs and maggots – crackers and cheese
 Drown the kids – boiled eggs
 Echo – repeat of the last order
 Eve with a lid – apple pie
 Fish eyes – tapioca pudding
 Foreign entanglements - spaghetti
 Greasy spoon – slang term for a diner
 Guess water – soup
 Hemorrhage – ketchup
 Hockey puck – a well-done burger
 Halitosis – garlic; originated in the 1920s.
 Hot blond in sand – coffee with cream and sugar
 Hot top – hot chocolate or chocolate sauce
 In the alley – served as a side dish
 In the weeds – overwhelmed
 Irish cherries – carrots
 Italian perfume – garlic; originated in the 1920s.
 Jamoka – coffee
 Java – coffee
 Jayne Mansfield – tall stack of pancakes
 Jewish round – bagel
 Joe – coffee
 Life preserver – doughnut
 Looseners – prunes
 Lumber – a toothpick
 Machine oil – syrup
 Maiden's delight – cherries
 Make it cry – add onion
 Moo juice – milk
 Mug of murk – black coffee
 Mully – beef stew
 Nervous pudding – Jell-O
 O'Connors – potatoes
 On a raft – Texas toast in place of buns
 On the hoof – cooked rare (for any kind of meat)
 Punk – bread
 Put wheels on it – carry-out order; to go
 Rabbit food – lettuce
 Radio sandwich – tuna fish sandwich
 Ripper – a deep fried hot dog
 Rush it – Russian dressing
 Sand – sugar
 Shingles with a shimmy and a shake – Buttered toast with jam
 Shit on a shingle – Chipped beef served on toast
 Sinker – doughnut
 Skid grease – butter
 Squeal – ham
 Sunny side up – a fried egg cooked on one side
 Sweepings – hash
 Take a chance – hash
 Tube steak – hot dog
 Two dots and a dash – two fried eggs and a strip of bacon
 Wet mystery – beef stew
 Whiskey down – rye toast
 With the works – with everything on it (for a sandwich)
 Wreck 'em – scrambled eggs
 Yard bird – chicken
 Yum yum – sugar

See also

 Coffee shop
 List of restaurant terminology
 Waffle House

References

Further reading
 DinerLingo.com

 
English-based argots
Lists of phrases
Occupational cryptolects
Restaurant terminology